The SNCAO CAO.600 was a French prototype twin-engined torpedo-bomber of the Second World War. It was intended to operate from two new aircraft carriers of the French Navy, but only a single example had been completed and flown when the surrender of France in June 1940 ended development of the aircraft.

Design and development

In 1937 the French Service Technique de l'Aeronautique (or Air Ministry) launched its A47 specification to replace the Aéronavale's elderly Levasseur PL.7 torpedo-bombers and Levasseur PL.101 reconnaissance aircraft, both obsolete biplanes, aboard the French Navy's two planned new aircraft carriers, the Joffre and Painlevé. The requirement demanded that the new aircraft, which was to act as a torpedo-bomber, level bomber and reconnaissance aircraft, had to have a maximum speed of over 300 km/h (186 mph), with an endurance of 3.5 hours as a torpedo-bomber and 6 hours on reconnaissance missions. Unusually for a carrier-based aircraft, particularly for 1937, the specification demanded that the new aircraft be twin-engined, carrying a crew of two as a torpedo bomber and three as a level bomber or reconnaissance aircraft.

An order for two prototypes was placed with the Société Nationale des Constructions Aéronautiques de l'Ouest (SNCAO) on 15 June 1939, with a similar order for two of the competing design from SNCAM, the Dewoitine D.750 following on 26 July. The SNCAO design, the SNCAO CAO.600 was an all-metal monoplane with an inverted gull wing and a retractable tailwheel undercarriage. The pilot and bombardier/navigator sat in separate cockpits with individual stepped windscreens, with the navigator in the extreme nose and the pilot above the leading edge of the wing. The radio-operator/gunner sat further aft, with his cockpit behind the wing. Power was provided by two Gnome-Rhône 14M radial engines.

Operational history

The first prototype made its maiden flight on 21 March 1940, being flown from Villacoublay to Istres on 31 March. It had completed 35 flying hours by 25 June when the test programme was stopped by the French surrender to Germany. The second prototype, which differed in having the folding wings required for carrier operations, was abandoned incomplete, while the first prototype was dismantled and stored until it was finally scrapped following the German occupation of Southern France in November 1942.

Specifications

See also

Notes

References

Green, William. War Planes of the Second World War:Volume Seven Bombers and Reconnaissance Aircraft. London:Macdonald, 1967. 
Green, William. War Planes of the Second World War:Volume Eight Bombers and Reconnaissance Aircraft. London:Macdonald, 1967.

External links
Aviafrance - S.N.C.A.O. CAO-600

1940s French bomber aircraft
1940s French military reconnaissance aircraft
600
Inverted gull-wing aircraft
Low-wing aircraft
Aircraft first flown in 1940
Twin piston-engined tractor aircraft